Morrisville Historic District may refer to:

Morrisville Historic District (Morrisville, North Carolina), listed on the National Register of Historic Places in Wake County, North Carolina
Morrisville Historic District (Morristown, Vermont), listed on the National Register of Historic Places in Lamoille County, Vermont